Sandro Calabro (born 11 April 1983) is a Dutch former professional footballer who played as a striker.

Club career
Calabro was born in The Hague, the son of Sicilian parents.

He moved from FC Volendam to Helmond Sport. In May 2007, it was announced that he would sign for VVV-Venlo. In the 2008–09 season, he was crowned topscorer of the Jupiler League, as VVV-Venlo were promoted to the Eredivisie.

Switzerland
On 18 May 2010, Calabro moved on a free transfer to Swiss team FC St. Gallen, signing a contract until 30 June 2012.

Belgium
He joined compatriots Roy Bakkenes, Kelvin Maynard and manager Jerrel Hasselbaink at Belgian Second Division club FC Antwerp in 2013 after a prolific season at Sparta. After being loaned by Antwerp for one season to RKC, Calabro moved to another Belgian side Deinze in July 2015, only to return to Holland in summer 2016 to play for Scheveningen in the Dutch Derde Divisie.

Post-playing career
After retirement, he focused on his own football agency business, which he started together with former Scheveningen teammate Marvin Nieuwlaat.

Honours

Club
Utrecht
 Johan Cruyff Shield: 2004

Individual
VVV Venlo
 Top scorer Eerste Divisie 2008–09: 25 goals

References

External links
  Voetbal International

1983 births
Living people
Footballers from The Hague
Association football forwards
Dutch footballers
ADO Den Haag players
FC Utrecht players
FC Volendam players
Helmond Sport players
VVV-Venlo players
FC St. Gallen players
Sparta Rotterdam players
Royal Antwerp F.C. players
RKC Waalwijk players
K.M.S.K. Deinze players
SVV Scheveningen players
Eredivisie players
Eerste Divisie players
Swiss Super League players
Challenger Pro League players
Dutch expatriate footballers
Expatriate footballers in Switzerland
Expatriate footballers in Belgium
Dutch people of Sicilian descent
Dutch expatriate sportspeople in Switzerland
Dutch expatriate sportspeople in Belgium